Zanardelli is a surname. Notable people with the surname include:

Giuseppe Zanardelli (1826–1903), Italian jurisconsult and politician, Grand Master of Italian Freemasonry
 Zanardelli Code, the Italian Penal Code of 1889
 Zanardelli Cabinet, Italian government from 15 February 1901 until 3 November 1903
Tito Zanardelli (1848–?), Italian journalist and anarchist
Fausto Zanardelli (born 1978), member of the Italian indie pop-hip hop musical duo Coma_Cose